The 1970 Illinois Fighting Illini football team was an American football team that represented the University of Illinois during the 1970 Big Ten Conference football season. In their fourth and final year under head coach Jim Valek, the Illini compiled a 3–7 record and finished in a tie for last place in the Big Ten Conference.

The team's offensive leaders were quarterback Mike Wells with 906 passing yards, running back Darrell Robinson with 749 rushing yards, and wide receiver Doug Dieken with 537 receiving yards. Dieken was selected for the second consecutive year as the team's most valuable player.

Schedule

Roster

Season summary

Oregon

References

Illinois
Illinois Fighting Illini football seasons
Illinois Fighting Illini football